James R. Engster is a journalist and host of "Talk Louisiana" on WRKF, the National Public Radio affiliate in Baton Rouge.

Engster is also owner and president of Louisiana Radio Network (LRN), which provides news, sports and agricultural news statewide. In 2014, he served as president of the National Association of Statewide Radio Networks, known as StateNets, which provides regional radio advertising campaigns for marketers nationwide. Engster is a political analyst for WAFB in Baton Rouge.

He currently hosts "Ask the Governor" a monthly call-in show for listeners to speak with Governor John Bel Edwards.

Education
Engster is a 1981 graduate of Louisiana State University and was inducted into the LSU Manship School Hall of Fame in 2012. In April 2018, the LSU Alumni Association inducted Engster into the LSU Hall of Distinction, an honor that recognizes alumni who have distinguished themselves and the university through their careers, civic accomplishments, volunteer activities, and loyalty to their alma mater.

Career
Since 1981, Engster has built his legacy as "the inveterate Louisiana talk radio host, historiographer, and pantomath of state politics."

From 1983-1998, Engster served as a reporter and news director for Louisiana Network. In 1998, he began hosting "Louisiana Live," a syndicated call-in talk show airing on more than 20 affiliates. "Louisiana Live" was named best public affairs program three times by the Louisiana-Mississippi Associated Press Managing Editors.

From 2003-2006, Engster served as general manager of WRKF.  In 2006, he returned to Louisiana Network as general manager. In April 2010, Engster bought a controlling interest in the network after the FCC granted its permission. Now serving as president, he renamed the company Louisiana Radio Network to reflect the medium. From 2004-October 2014, “The Jim Engster Show” was heard live on NPR affiliate WRKF-FM.

From 2014 - 2017, he hosted "The Jim Engster Show" on the commercial station WBRP.

In addition to his work in radio, Engster also is a long-time featured columnist and current president of Tiger Rag Magazine, “the Bible of LSU sports.” Acquired by LRN in 2000, the magazine focuses on sports at Louisiana State University. It analyzes numerous LSU sports teams, including football, baseball, basketball, and track and field. Engster’s column “Statistically Speaking” incites frequent comments from readers and LSU insiders. In 2018, Engster was named Louisiana Sports Writers Association's Columnist of the Year for his contributions to Tiger Rag Magazine.

The Public Relations Association of Louisiana named Engster Communicator of the Year in 2008. The YWCA Greater Baton Rouge awarded him the Racial Justice Award in 2011 "for his advocacy of racial and social justice". Engster is currently serving his eighth term as Media Board Chairman of the Press Club of Baton Rouge and is also the president of the LSU Media Board, which oversees student media operations.

References 

American radio personalities
Living people
People from Baton Rouge, Louisiana
Louisiana State University alumni
Year of birth missing (living people)